Cvitko Bilić (born 19 October 1943) is a former Croatian road bicycle racer active in the 1960s and 1970s who competed for Yugoslavia at the 1968 and 1972 Summer Olympics.

Bilić was voted Croatian Sportsman of the Year in 1966 by the Croatian sports daily Sportske novosti.

Olympic results

References

External links

1943 births
Living people
Croatian male cyclists
Yugoslav male cyclists
Cyclists at the 1968 Summer Olympics
Cyclists at the 1972 Summer Olympics
Olympic cyclists of Yugoslavia